The Washington State Department of Labor and Industries (L&I) is a department of the Washington state government that regulates and enforces labor standards. The agency administers the state's workers' compensation system, conducts workplace inspections, licenses and certifies trade workers, and issues permits for heavy machinery.

History

The Department of Labor and Industries was created by an act of the state legislature in 1921, overseeing industrial insurance, worker safety, and industrial relations. The new agency superseded the Bureau of Labor, created in 1901 to inspect workplaces, and minor state boards and commissions monitoring worker health, safety, and insurance claims.

In 1973, the state legislature passed the Washington Industrial Safety and Health Act, which superseded the federal Occupational Safety and Health Act (OSHA) and allowed L&I greater powers to investigate employers and enforce state and federal labor laws. Washington became one of the first states to implement their own labor laws, which received full approval from OSHA in 1976.

Structure

L&I has a budget of $2.7 billion for the term of 2015–2025  and has employed 2,891 people. The department is divided into several divisions, including the Divisions of Occupational Safety and Health, Workers' Compensation, Field and Public Safety, and Fraud Prevention and Labor Standards. The department's director is appointed by the state governor and serves in the executive cabinet.

Offices

In addition to its headquarters in Tumwater, L&I has offices in 19 cities across the state.

References

External links

Chapter 43.22 of the Revised Code of Washington

Labor relations in Washington (state)
Labor and Industries
State departments of labor of the United States
1921 establishments in Washington (state)
Government agencies established in 1921